The Hertfordshire County Board or Hertfordshire GAA is one of the 7 county boards of the Gaelic Athletic Association (GAA) in Great Britain, and is responsible for the administration of Gaelic games in Hertfordshire, England.

Clubs
Football
Cambridge Parnells (Cambridge) - Ladies' and Men's Gaelic football
Claddagh Gaels (Luton) - Ladies' Gaelic football
Éire Óg (Oxford) - Ladies' and Men's Gaelic football
Glen Rovers (Watford) - Men's Gaelic football
St Joseph's (Waltham Cross) - Mens Gaelic football
St Colmcille's (St Albans) - Ladies' and Men's Gaelic football
St Vincent's (Luton) - Men's Gaelic football
St Dympna's (Luton) - Men's Gaelic football

Additionally, there are two University teams in the region:
University of Cambridge
University of Oxford and Oxford Brookes

Hurling
St Declan's (amalgamation of all clubs) - competes at hurling in the Warwickshire region

History
The county board was created in 1960 when it was deemed that the number of clubs in the region north of London supported a separate league. The area is not in fact just Hertfordshire but encompasses Oxfordshire, Buckinghamshire, Bedfordshire, Huntingdonshire and Cambridgeshire.

Present Day
Hertfordshire is probably among the weakest of the British counties as a result of the small number of large population centres in the region it serves. It has further been affected by the general trend of reduced emigration from Ireland to the UK since the 1980s. As a result, a number of the original clubs have folded – including the Milton Keynes-based team Erin Go Bragh in 2005. However, a resurgence may be underway. The youth sections of the county have proven to be very promising and in 2018 the Hertfordshire under-14s won the Féile Peile na nÓg in Meath, and followed this by winning a shield competition in Connacht the year after.

Football

Clubs

Clubs contest the Hertfordshire Senior Football Championship. Éire Óg are the current title holders. Each year the winners represent the county in the All-Britain Junior Club Football Championship.

County Team
Hertfordshire county football team currently competes in the All-Britain Junior Football Championship which is part of the All-Ireland Junior Football Championship (Tier 3 of the All-Ireland Senior Football Championship).

Honours
 All-Britain Junior Football Championship
 Runners-Up (1): 2013

Hurling

Clubs
Hertfordshire has no hurling championship and currently only has one hurling club, St. Declan’s. They compete in the Warwickshire Senior Hurling Championship.

County Team
Hertfordshire currently does not field a county hurling team in the All-Ireland Senior Hurling Championship.

Honours
 All-Ireland Junior Hurling Championship
 Runners-Up (2): 1970, 1971

Hertfordshire Senior Football Championship

References

External links
Hertfordshire GAA Website

British GAA
Gaelic games governing bodies in the United Kingdom
Sport in Hertfordshire
Sports organizations established in 1960